Kym Karath is an American former actress, best known for her role as Gretl, the youngest of the Von Trapp children in The Sound of Music.

Career
 
Kym Karath was born in Los Angeles, California, and started her career at the age of 4, when she appeared in Spencer's Mountain (1963) with Henry Fonda and Veronica Cartwright (she subsequently worked with Veronica's younger sister, Angela Cartwright, in The Sound of Music).  Also in 1963, Karath was seen in The Thrill of It All with Doris Day and James Garner.  In 1964, she was seen in  Good Neighbor Sam with Jack Lemmon.

Karath is best remembered for her role in The Sound of Music, where she played the youngest child, Gretl Von Trapp.

Personal life
Karath graduated from the University of Southern California with a degree in humanities, and shortly after that she moved to Paris, France, where she studied art history and modeled. At the age of 26, she married Philippe L'Equibec; their son was born in 1991. Thereafter she left acting for a while and lived in Greenwich, Connecticut, before resuming acting in 2005.

Karath has said she still is not fond of water after nearly drowning in the boat scene in The Sound of Music, as she could not swim.

Filmography

Film

Television

References

External links
 
 
 Karath @KymKarath - Twitter

Living people
American child actresses
American film actresses
Female models from California
American people of Greek descent
University of Southern California alumni
American television actresses
Actresses from Los Angeles
20th-century American actresses
21st-century American actresses
Year of birth missing (living people)